Boot Lake may refer to the following bodies of water:

Boot Lake (Anoka County, Minnesota)
Boot Lake (Cass County, Minnesota)
Boot Lake (Lake County, Minnesota)
Boot Lake (Nova Scotia)

See also
Little Boot Lake